Clevedon School, formerly known as  Clevedon Community School, is a coeducational secondary school located in Clevedon, North Somerset, England. It has 1,117 pupils, in years 7 to 11 in the Lower School and 12 to 13 in the Upper School or sixth form. The school recently regained its Language College status. As of 2021 the Head of School is Jim Smith and the Executive Headteacher is John Wells. The school is part of the Clevedon Learning Trust, a Multi-Academy Trust formed on 1 January 2015 by CEO John Wells. The new CEO of the Clevedon Learning Trust as of 2022 is Gary Schlick. The Trust is made up of school clusters in the Clevedon and Bridgwater localities.

Within the school grounds, the school operates Clevedon School Sports Centre, which has a large sports hall, a gymnasium, a dance studio, two squash courts, a running track, netball/tennis courts, an all-weather pitch as well as two large fields being split in two by Holly Lane. The sports centre is home to clubs including Swiss Valley Rangers FC and Clevedon Athletics Club.

The school was built in 1962 and has a mixture of old and new buildings. Much of the school site still has the old buildings such as the main block, some refurbished such as the Maths Block (refurbished in 2014) and some modern buildings such as the Sixth Form Block and Science Block (recently renamed The Colin Bennet Science Centre). The school's library, Xenia, deriving from the Greek meaning of hospitality, opened in 2022.

Clevedon School appeared in the ITV crime drama, Broadchurch, as South Wessex Secondary School; some of the students also appeared in the programme.

House system

The house system, which came into being in September 2006, consists of four houses: Conygar (red), Marine (blue), Valley (green) and Walton (yellow). All pupils and most staff belong to one of the four houses. The houses' names are derived from road names in Clevedon.

Formerly, (until 2006) the house system had also divided the pupils and teachers into four houses, which were named after famous Clevedon residents and visitors: Arthur Hallam (red), William Makepeace Thackeray (green), Alfred Tennyson, 1st Baron Tennyson (blue) and Samuel Taylor Coleridge (yellow).

Vertical tutoring
At Clevedon School each house consists of ten tutor groups with a mix of students from years 7 to 11. In Sixth Form, each house consists of two tutor groups for Year 12 and 13. Each tutor group has around 4 to 6 students from each year group.

School performance
Both value-added and GCSE results are very good. Recent A/AS level results (2007 and 2008) have also been good, when compared to schools in the area.

Performing arts

The school has a Youth Theatre, which in 2022 put on a performance of Chicken!, a play about road safety by  Mark Wheeller.

Notable alumni

Huw Bennett, Rugby International.
Jack Butland, International Footballer.
Nathan Catt, Rugby player
Kate Reed, Olympian.

References

Academies in North Somerset
Buildings and structures in Clevedon
Secondary schools in North Somerset